Wheeler County is a county located in the central portion of the U.S. state of Georgia. As of the 2020 census, the population was 7,471. The county seat is Alamo. The county is one of the most impoverished counties in the nation. The  American Community Survey's 2009–2013 average reports that the county's per-capita income of $8,948 makes it the second-poorest county in the United States by this metric. The measurement however is misleading as Wheeler County is the site of Wheeler Correctional Facility, a large prison with a capacity of 3,028 prisoners, about 40 percent of the county's total population. Most prisoners have little income. The prison was opened in 1998 and the prison population may also account for the increased population of the county in the early 2000s.

History
Wheeler County is named after Confederate General Joseph Wheeler.  The constitutional amendment to create the county was proposed August 14, 1912, and ratified November 5, 1912.

Geography

The eastern portion of Wheeler County, defined by a line running from north of Alamo to the southern border of the county, due south of Mount Vernon, is located in the Lower Oconee River sub-basin of the Altamaha River basin. The bulk of the rest of the county is located in the Little Ocmulgee River sub-basin of the same Altamaha River basin, except for a small southern portion of Wheeler County, east of Lumber City, which is located in the Lower Ocmulgee River sub-basin of the larger Altamaha River basin.

Major highways

  U.S. Route 280
  U.S. Route 319
  U.S. Route 441
  State Route 19
  State Route 30
  State Route 31
  State Route 46
  State Route 126
  State Route 149

Adjacent counties
 Treutlen County (north)
 Montgomery County (east)
 Jeff Davis County (southeast)
 Telfair County (southwest)
 Dodge County (west)
 Laurens County (northwest)

Demographics

2000 census
At the 2000 census there were 6,179 people, 2,011 households, and 1,395 families living in the county.  The population density was 21 people per square mile (8/km2).  There were 2,447 housing units at an average density of 8 per square mile (3/km2).  The racial makeup of the county was 64.56% White, 33.18% Black or African American, 0.13% Native American, 0.10% Asian, 1.25% from other races, and 0.79% from two or more races.  3.54% of the population were Hispanic or Latino of any race.
Of the 2,011 households 32.60% had children under the age of 18 living with them, 52.10% were married couples living together, 13.00% had a female householder with no husband present, and 30.60% were non-families. 27.80% of households were one person and 14.80% were one person aged 65 or older.  The average household size was 2.54 and the average family size was 3.08.

The age distribution was 22.40% under the age of 18, 10.20% from 18 to 24, 31.60% from 25 to 44, 23.10% from 45 to 64, and 12.70% 65 or older.  The median age was 36 years. For every 100 females there were 128.10 males.  For every 100 females age 18 and over, there were 139.80 males.

The median household income was $24,053 and the median family income  was $29,696. Males had a median income of $27,203 versus $22,679 for females. The per capita income for the county was $13,005.  About 21.60% of families and 25.30% of the population were below the poverty line, including 30.20% of those under age 18 and 26.70% of those age 65 or over.

2010 census
At the 2010 census, there were 7,421 people, 2,152 households, and 1,519 families living in the county. The racial makeup of the county was 61.3% white, 35.2% black or African American, 0.2% Asian, 0.1% American Indian, 2.3% from other races, and 0.8% from two or more races. Those of Hispanic or Latino origin made up 4.8% of the population. In terms of ancestry, 32.4% were English, and 8.1% were American.

Of the 2,152 households, 34.2% had children under the age of 18 living with them, 49.6% were married couples living together, 15.5% had a female householder with no husband present, 29.4% were non-families, and 26.0% of households were made up of individuals. The average household size was 2.54 and the average family size was 3.05. The median age was 37.9 years.

The median household income was $35,422 and the median family income  was $45,042. Males had a median income of $35,114 versus $25,329 for females. The per capita income for the county was $10,043. About 14.3% of families and 24.3% of the population were below the poverty line, including 31.6% of those under age 18 and 36.4% of those age 65 or over.

2020 census

As of the 2020 United States census, there were 7,471 people, 1,862 households, and 1,159 families residing in the county.

Communities
 Alamo (county seat)
 Glenwood

Politics

See also

 National Register of Historic Places listings in Wheeler County, Georgia
List of counties in Georgia

References 

 
Georgia (U.S. state) counties
1912 establishments in Georgia (U.S. state)
Populated places established in 1912